Dandeli National Park is a protected area in the Western Ghats, India.

The park was created in 2007 by merging with the neighboring Anshi Nature Reserve as part of a tiger protection program. Today, they cover an area of about 834 square kilometers.Nature lovers here can enjoy an unforgettable landscape and admire the richness of diversity.

Flora 
The forest is mostly evergreen with shades of olive, caused by numerous creepers, wildflowers and shrubs.Some of the plant species that thrive here are: Eucalyptus, Tectona grandis, Grevillea robusta, T. bellerica, Adina cordifolia, Mitragyna parviflora, Acacia, Xylia xylocarpa and various types of orchids.

See also
 Dandeli Wildlife Sanctuary

References

External links
Dandeli Tourism

National parks in Karnataka
Protected areas with year of establishment missing